Cultes des Goules is the fourth studio album by the electronic artist Nekropolis. It was released independently in 1985.

The title of the album is no doubt inspired by the fictional grimoire Cultes des Goules by the Comte d'Erlette (see Books in the Cthulhu Mythos, which was invented by horror writer Robert Bloch.

Track listing

Personnel
Adapted from the Cultes des Goules liner notes.

 Peter Frohmader – synthesizer, electronics, fretless bass guitar, eight-string bass guitar, twelve-string guitar, percussion, effects, choir, engineering, mixing, cover art
Musicians
 Stephan Manus – violin
 Birgit Metzger – vocals
 Oliver Plett – German flute
 Stefan Plett – alto saxophone

Production and additional personnel
 H. R. Giger – photography

Release history

References

External links 
 

1985 albums
Peter Frohmader albums
Nekropolis albums